Rajeev Ram and Nenad Zimonjić were the defending champions, but chose not to participate.
David Marrero and Fernando Verdasco won the title, defeating Dominic Inglot and Denis Istomin in the final, 7–6(8–6), 6–3.

Seeds

Draw

Draw

References
 Main Draw

2013 Doubles
St. Petersburg Open - Doubles
St. Petersburg Open - Doubles